Mochilki is a rural locality (a village) in Znamensky Selsoviet, Belebeyevsky District, Bashkortostan, Russia. The population was 113 as of 2010. There are 4 streets.

Geography 
Mochilki is located 34 km east of Belebey (the district's administrative centre) by road. Znamenka is the nearest rural locality.

References 

Rural localities in Belebeyevsky District